Nh is a digraph of the Latin alphabet, a combination of N and H. Together with ilh and the interpunct, it is a typical feature of Occitan, a language illustrated by medieval troubadours. It commonly represents the voiced palatal nasal [ɲ], which is the same sound as the Spanish letter Ñ.

African languages
In some African languages, such as Gogo, nh is a voiceless .

In the pre-1985 orthography of Guinea for its languages, nh represented a velar , which is currently written ŋ.

Asian languages

Japanese
Early romanizations of Japanese, influenced by Portuguese orthography, sometimes used nh to represent a prepalatal. Today, this is usually written ny.

Vietnamese
In Vietnamese, nh represents a palatal  word-initially. It was formerly considered a distinct letter, but is no longer. When this digraph occurs word-finally, its phonetic value varies between dialects:
 In the northern dialect, it represents a velar nasal, just as ng does; however, its presence may alter the pronunciation of the preceding vowel.
 In the southern dialect, it represents an alveolar nasal and shortens the preceding vowel.
The Vietnamese alphabet inherited this digraph from the Portuguese orthography.

Australian languages
In the transcription of Australian Aboriginal languages, nh represents a dental . Due to allophony, it may also represent a palatal .

American languages
In Purépecha and Pipil, it is a velar nasal, .

In the Cuoq Orthography in Algonquin, and in the Fiero Orthography in Ojibwe and Odaawaa, it indicates the vowel preceding it is nasalized.

European languages

Occitan
In Occitan, nh represents a palatal .

For n·h, see .

Portuguese
In Portuguese, nh represents a palatal . Due to allophony, it may represent the nasal palatal approximant  in most Brazilian, Santomean and Angolan dialects. It is not considered a distinct letter. Portuguese borrowed this digraph from Occitan.

Galician
In Galician, there are two diverging norms which give nh differing values.
 According to the Real Academia Galega norm, nh represents a velar , while ñ represents a palatal .
 According to the reintegrationist norm, mh represents a velar nasal , while nh represents a palatal .
In neither norm  is nh considered a distinct letter.

Welsh
In Welsh, nh is a voiceless alveolar nasal,  (a  under the nasal mutation).

See also
 ny (digraph)
 Portuguese orthography

References

External links
Practical Orthography of African Languages

Latin-script digraphs